Bárid mac Oitir (died 914) was a Viking leader who may have ruled the Isle of Man in the early 10th century.

Biography
Bárid mac Oitir is mentioned once in contemporary Irish annals. The Annals of Ulster in 914 record:

This incident is the earliest known occasion where Vikings are linked with Man.

Notes

References

Citations

Primary sources

Secondary sources

External links
 CELT: Corpus of Electronic Texts at University College Cork. The Corpus of Electronic Texts includes the Annals of Ulster and the Four Masters, the Chronicon Scotorum and the Book of Leinster as well as Genealogies, and various Saints' Lives. Most are translated into English, or translations are in progress.

Viking rulers
914 deaths
10th-century Vikings